The Ministry of Transport (Arabic:  وزارة  النقل) is a cabinet ministry of Yemen.

List of ministers 

 Abdulsalam Saleh Humaid (18 December 2020 – present)
 Saleh al-Jabwani (2017–2020)
 Murad Ali Mohamed (2015–2017)
 Badr Baslmah (2014–2015)
 Waid Badhib (2011–2014)
 Khaled Ibrahim al-Wazir (2007–2011)

See also 
Politics of Yemen

References 

 

Government ministries of Yemen